Sree Poornathrayesa temple is a Hindu temple situated in Tripunithura, Kochi, the capital of the former Kingdom of Cochin, Kerala, India. 
The temple is considered among the greatest temples in Kerala and was the first among eight royal temples of the erstwhile Kochi Kingdom. The deity was also considered the national deity of Cochin and protector guardian of Tripunithura. The deity in this temple is Lord Vishnu, who is in the form of Santhanagopala Murthy. Lord Poornathrayeesa is known for his love of elephants. Hence more than 40 elephants participate in his Vrishchikotsavam.

The temple is famous for its yearly  or festivals.
It is believed that childless couples will be blessed with children on praying Poornathrayesan. Offering  (money offered to the lord) to Poornathrayeesa in the most pure gold pot on  day (fourth day of ) is the greatest achievement that a devotee can achieve.

History
 See also #Detailed History of Poornathrayesa Temple

Traditions say that Lord Vishnu offered the idol of Sree Poornathrayeesa to Arjuna (the third of the five Pandava brothers), when he sought the help of the Lord to give rebirth to the ten children of a Brahmin. The ten children and the sacred idol were taken by Arjuna in his chariot and he handed over the children to the Brahmin. In memory of this event, a temple was built with a sanctum sanctorum in the form of a chariot. Lord Ganesh was sent by Arjuna to search a holy place for the installation of Lord Vishnu. Earlier, the idol was kept in a palace which is situated at the west of the main temple and now it is known as Poonithura Kottaram.

Lord Ganesh, who was attracted by the holiness of the ancient Vedic village, Poornavedapuram (now Tripunithura), tried to occupy the place for himself. However, Arjuna pushed him away to the southern side of the sanctum and installed his idol there. This is different from the usual custom, where Lord Ganesh has a separate shrine at the south-western side of the inner prakaram. As the place was bounded by mustard fields, Arjuna used some mustard seeds to get oil for lighting a lamp. A Valia Vilakku is situated in front of the idol; people say that the burnt oil of this traditional lamp contains medicinal value.

According to legend, it is believed that Sree Poornathrayeesa is the elder brother of the goddesses of Eroor Pisharikovil Temple and Chottanikkara Temple. It is also believed that the lord was married to a Namboothiri girl, Nangema, from Vadakkedathu Mana. During the annual temple festival occasions, deities from Perumthrikovil Temple (Lord Shiva) and Eroor Pisharikovil Temple (Lakshmi) visit here for their aaraattu and a combined pooja and procession thereafter. This is locally called Sankara-Narayana Vilakku (Shiva and Vishnu) and Laksmi-Narayana Vilakku (Goddess Lakshmi and Lord Vishnu). The Aaraattu (the holy bath of the deity) of Sree Poornathrayeesa takes place at the temple pond of Chakkamkulangara Shiva Temple, which is situated north-east of the Sree Poornathrayeesa Temple.

The moolasthaanam or 'origin' is located in Poonithura Sree Krishna Temple, which is 1.5 km west of Sree Poornathrayeesha temple. The then-ruler shifted the deity from the place to the existing location.

Temple structure

The temple is designed in accordance with Kerala temple architecture. A major fire occurred in 1920, which destroyed much of the original structure, particularly the sanctum sanctorum which was built extensively in wood. This led to redesigning the temple in concrete, for the first time in Kerala. Designed by the illustrious architect Sri Eachara Warrier, the temple was redesigned with concrete structure, covered cleverly with copper plates, wooden panels and granite tiles to recreate the traditional structure feeling.

The side walls of the sanctum sanctorum were heavily decorated with large brass sheets with statutes of gods and goddess, while the roof is covered with copper sheets, while the entrances of sanctum sanctorum were covered with gold sheets.

Architecture

The first floor of the two-storied gopuram consists of a mandapam (Dias), and eight carved wooden pillars support the mandapam.

Famous Festivals

Ambalam Kathi Ulsavam is a unique festival which is observed to commemorate this incident. Thousands of devotees gather at the temple on this special day which falls in the month of Thulam. After the evening deeparadhana, they set fire to camphor arranged around the temple. All the lamps are lit and it gives off a feeling that the entire temple is on fire.

However, this is not the only festival in this temple. The Vrishchikolsavam, which is in late November, is the main festival at this temple.

Vrishchika Ulsavam is a festival which usually starts in November–December every year. The festival lasts for eight days, with events running 24/7. Events feature traditional folk art forms such as Ottan Thullal, Kathakali, thayambaka, Chenda melam, katcheri, maddala ppattu, kombu pattu, and kuzhal pattu. Stalls are set up in front of and behind the temple selling food and various articles.

Apart from this, the temple also hosts two other main festivals and other small celebrations as well every year. The birthday of Sree Poornathrayeesha falls on "Uthram" Nakshathra of the Malayalam month Kumbham (February–March), which is preceded by Para Utsavam, where people give special offerings to the temple.  Every year in August–September, there is another festival called Mooshari Utsavam in commemoration of the sculptor who had moulded the divine image of Sree Poornathrayeesan. It is believed the sculptor himself merged with the divine to give life to the amazing mould of Poornathrayeesha, which is still used in the sanctum.

Lakshmi Naryana Vilakku, Uthram Vilakku and Thulam Ombath Utsavam are other main celebrations every year.

See also
Chottanikkara Temple
Elephants in Kerala culture
Temples of Kerala

Gallery

References

External links 

Tripunithura.net (The palace city of Kerala)
Sreepoornathrayeesa.org (Official website of Sree Poornathrayeesa Kshethra Upadesaka Samithi)

Hindu temples in Ernakulam district
Vishnu temples
Mahavishnu temples in Kerala